"Empire of the Ants" is a 1905 short story by H. G. Wells.

Empire of the Ants may also refer to:
Empire of the Ants (film), 1977 horror film loosely based on the H.G. Wells story
Empire of the Ants (novel), a 1991 science-fiction novel by Bernard Werber
Empire of the Ants (video game), a 2000 video game by Microïds